There Was Once a Loyal Hussar is a 1929 German film directed by Carl Heinz Wolff and starring Grit Haid. It was shot at the Halensee Studios in Berlin. It takes its title from the opening line of the traditional song "The Faithful Hussar".

Cast

References

Bibliography

External links 
 

1929 films
Films of the Weimar Republic
1920s German-language films
Films directed by Carl Heinz Wolff
German black-and-white films
1920s German films
Films shot at Halensee Studios